Philip Nossmy (December 6, 1982) is a Swedish male athlete who competes in the 110 metres hurdles. Nossmy became European champion for 19-year-old juniors in 2001 on the distance.

Competition record

References 

Swedish male hurdlers
1982 births
Living people